"Sugar Daddy" is a song written by David Bellamy, and recorded by American country music duo The Bellamy Brothers.  It was released in January 1980 as the first single from the album You Can Get Crazy.  The song was the second of ten number one singles on the country chart for The Bellamy Brothers.  The single stayed at number one for a single week and spent a total of eleven weeks on the country chart.

Chart performance

References
 

1980 singles
The Bellamy Brothers songs
Warner Records singles
Curb Records singles
Songs written by David Bellamy (singer)
1980 songs